Michael Steven Boso (born 3 September 1991) is a Solomon Islands footballer who plays as a defender for Suva F.C. in Fiji. He made his debut for the national team on October 5, 2016, in a 3–0 loss against New Caledonia.

International
Boso was named to the Solomon Islands national squad for the first time for the 2016 OFC Nations Cup, but he didn't make the final squad. He made his debut four months later in a match against New Caledonia.

References
 

Living people
1991 births
Association football defenders
Solomon Islands international footballers
Solomon Islands footballers
Western United F.C. players
Marist F.C. players
Team Wellington players
Suva F.C. players
New Zealand Football Championship players